The Friedmann Prize is a Soviet and Russian physics prize, awarded for outstanding work in cosmology and gravity. It is named after the Russian cosmologist Alexander Alexandrovich Friedmann.

Between 1972 and 1990 the prize was awarded by the USSR Academy of Sciences for the best scientific work in the field of meteorology. It was re-established by the Russian Academy of Sciences in 1993. It is generally awarded to a single scientist once every three years.

Recipients 
Source:

See also

 List of astronomy awards
 List of meteorology awards
 List of physics awards

References 

Awards of the Russian Academy of Sciences
Physics awards
Physical cosmology
Meteorology awards
USSR Academy of Sciences
Orders, decorations, and medals of the Soviet Union
Meteorology in the Soviet Union